Two French Navy ships have borne the name Duguesclin in honour of Bertrand du Guesclin:

 , a  74-gun ship of the line 
 , a 90-gun  ship of the line

 

French Navy ship names